Club Row is a row of sandstone terraced houses on Higher Road in the English market town of Longridge, Lancashire, built between 1793 and 1804. Grade II listed, and numbered 6 to 44, they each have slate roofs and were built by the Longridge Building Club, one of the earliest terminating building societies in England. They have two storeys and cellars entered at the rear, and each house has one bay.  The windows and doorways have plain surrounds.  The doorways are grouped in threes, the centre door leading to the rear yard.  The cellars were used for handloom weaving.

Popular culture
The row is mentioned in Barry Durham's book The Legend of Arthur King and Other Tales of the Supernatural as the residence of British seaman George Hewitt.

See also
Listed buildings in Longridge

References

Sources

 

Longridge
1793 establishments in England
Houses completed in 1793
Grade II listed buildings in Lancashire
Houses in Lancashire
Buildings and structures in Ribble Valley